The Giant Rat of Sumatra is a fictional giant rat, first mentioned by Arthur Conan Doyle in "The Adventure of the Sussex Vampire". As part of the tale, the protagonist, Sherlock Holmes, declares that there is a "story" connected with this rat, presumably a detective case he has handled. The name of the rat and its implied unpublished history were later used in works by many other writers.

Original reference

In "The Adventure of the Sussex Vampire", first published in the January 1924 issues of The Strand Magazine in London and Hearst's International Magazine in New York, Doyle has Sherlock Holmes declare, as an aside, to Dr. Watson:

Matilda Briggs was not the name of a young woman, Watson, ... It was a ship which is associated with the giant rat of Sumatra, a story for which the world is not yet prepared.

How the ship, the mammal, and the Indonesian island are associated is not specified. Rats commonly colonize ships, and so there is an obvious line of speculation.

Another train of thought follows the reasoning that Matilda Briggs actually was the name of a young woman as well as a fictional ship – for the famous "mystery ship", the Mary Celeste, which was found abandoned at sea in 1872, had sailed under the command of Captain Benjamin Briggs, whose daughter, Sophia Matilda Briggs, was a passenger on the doomed merchant brigantine. Doyle was certainly familiar with the Briggs family, for in the January 1884 issue of the Cornhill Magazine, when he was but a 25-year-old ship's surgeon, he had published a short story about the mysteriously abandoned Mary Celeste titled "J. Habakuk Jephson's Statement". As it was a work of fiction, Doyle did not adhere strictly to the facts; he renamed the ship Marie Celeste, the captain's name was given as "J.W. Tibbs", and the fatal voyage was said to have taken place in 1873 – but his story proved so popular and influential that many people to this day still refer to the vessel as the Marie Celeste, rather than the Mary Celeste.

Giant Indonesian rats 

A number of species of large rats have existed and, in some cases, still live on Sumatra, Papua, East Timor, and other Indonesian islands:

 In 1983, the Mountain Giant Sunda Rat (Sundamys infraluteus), which is only somewhat larger than a Norway rat, averaging around 0.3 kilograms in weight, was actually referred to as the "giant rat of Sumatra" in an article in The New York Times.
 In a lecture delivered in 1994 and published online in 2014, Holmesian Alan Saunders argued that a giant Sumatran rat species was being used by the villain Culverton Smith as the carrier of the disease known as Tapanuli Fever, a feature of Doyle's  "The Adventure of the Dying Detective". (Tapanuli is an administrative district of North West Sumatra; the highly lethal infectious disease is also known as Melioidosis; it is caused by the bacterium Burkholderia pseudomallei.) Saunders identified the rat as the Large Sumatran Bamboo Rat (Rhizomys sumatrensis); this species can reach lengths of nearly 50 cm with a 20 cm tail, and weigh up to 4 kilos (8.8 lbs); it is in real life a carrier of the disease-causing mold, Penicillium marneffei, which can also be lethal.
 A new species in the Woolly Rat (Mallomys) genus was discovered in 2007 in the Foja Mountains of Papua; it weighs 1.4 kilograms (3.1 lb) and has been compared to Holmes's animal.
 In 2015, the discovery of fossils of "seven new species of giant rat", including the "largest rat ever" on the island of East Timor was announced. The biggest of these Coryphomys rats was described as weighing "5 kilos (11 pounds), the size of a small dog," and was referred to as the "Giant Rat" in news stories.

In Sherlockiana

A number of authors of Sherlockiana have endeavoured to supply the missing adventure of the giant rat of Sumatra, either in non-canonical Holmesian fiction, or as references to the tale in other fictional settings:

 In "The Giant Rat of Sumatra," an episode of the radio series The New Adventures of Sherlock Holmes written by Edith Meiser, and first broadcast on 1 March 1942, Professor Moriarty arranges for the titular rodent, infected with bubonic plague, to be transported to England on board the Matilda Briggs.  This episode is apparently lost, but is described in some detail by Jim Harmon in his book The Great Radio Heroes.
 In The Spider Woman (1944), Nigel Bruce's Watson briefly reflects on the Giant Rat of Sumatra when looking through a scrapbook of old cases.
 In Pursuit to Algiers (1945), a Holmes film starring Basil Rathbone and Nigel Bruce, Watson tells the story of the Giant Rat of Sumatra to an audience on board a ship.
 The Tale of the Giant Rat of Sumatra, a 1974 comedy album by the Firesign Theatre (LP Columbia KC32730) is a pun-filled pastiche featuring the protagonists Hemlock Stones, the 'Great Defective', and his biographer and companion, Dr. John Flotsom, O. D. Part of the narrative takes place aboard the Matilda Briggs and the name of this ship induces the group to perform the song "Frigate Matilda" (to the tune of "Waltzing Matilda"), which has become something of a cult standard.
 The 1975 novel Sherlock Holmes's War of the Worlds is a sequel to H. G. Wells' science fiction novel The War of the Worlds, written by Manly Wade Wellman and his son Wade Wellman as a pastiche crossover which combines H. G. Wells' extraterrestrial invasion story with Doyle's Sherlock Holmes and Professor Challenger stories. During the course of the narrative, Holmes mentions that Professor Challenger helped solve the case of the giant rat, although the actual name of the case is not stated.
 The Giant Rat of Sumatra  is a 1976 novel by Rick Boyer which features the return of The Hound of the Baskervilles villain Stapleton. In this novel, the "giant rat" turns out to be a vicious Malayan tapir. 
 In The Talons of Weng-Chiang, a 1977 Doctor Who TV serial set in Victorian London, the hero (dressed in deerstalker and accompanied by a medical doctor with a housekeeper known as Mrs. Hudson) confronts a giant rat in the sewers of London.
 The Holmes-Dracula File is a 1978 novel by Fred Saberhagen in which Holmes and Dracula (who turns out to be related to Holmes) uncover a plot to destroy London with plague-bearing rats, the Giant Rat being a living plague vector.
 All-Consuming Fire is a 1994 Doctor Who novel by Andy Lane, part of the New Adventures series; in this story, the Doctor joins forces with Holmes and Watson to confront Azathoth, an entity from H. P. Lovecraft's Cthulhu Mythos. The giant rat is portrayed as an alien monster.
 "The Giant Rat of Sumatra" is the title of a 1996 short story by Paula Volsky, included in Eternal Lovecraft: The Persistence of H. P. Lovecraft in Popular Culture.
 The Giant Rat of Sumatra is a 1997 title in the Hardy Boys juvenile mystery series, written by Franklin W. Dixon. Frank and Joe Hardy investigate the sabotage of a new musical play based on the Sherlock Holmes story.
 The Giant Rat of Sumatra (1998) is the second novel in the Baker Street Mysteries juvenile series written by Jake and Luke Thoene.
 The Shadow of the Rat is a 1999 novel by David Stuart Davies that deals with the rat, a breed from Sumatra, as part of a biological warfare plot against London, England using the bubonic plague; the Matilda Briggs is the ship that brings the rats to London. The story line echoes the plot of Edith Meiser's radio play mentioned above. 
 The 2000 - 2001 television drama series Murder Rooms (featuring the adventures of a young Arthur Conan Doyle and his mentor) includes an episode wherein a circus manager mentions having featured the 'Giant Rat of Sumatra' in his freak show.  He confesses that the animal was actually a terrier dog with no fur.
 Sherlock Holmes and the Giant Rat of Sumatra is a 2002 novel by Alan Vanneman. A cousin of Dr. Watson's late wife travels to Baker Street from Singapore to consult Sherlock Holmes regarding her husband's mysterious suicide; the 'Matilda Briggs' does not appear in this book. (Carroll & Graf)
 The Oriental Casebook of Sherlock Holmes is a 2003 collection of short stories by Ted Riccardi in which an adventure involves the Giant Rat of Sumatra.
 In Sherlock Holmes and the Giant Rat of Sumatra, a 2010 novel by Paul D. Gilbert, Holmes investigates the mysterious reappearance of the long-overdue clipper 'Matilda Briggs.'
 In Charlie Marlow and the Giant Rat of Sumatra, a 2012 novel by Spanish author Alberto López Aroca, the Norwegian Sigerson (Sherlock Holmes in disguise) travels in 1893 to the Island of Mist, near Sumatra. The main character of this story is captain Charles Marlow.
 In 2014, the first episode of the third series of BBC's Sherlock, "The Empty Hearse", features a "giant rat of Sumatra Road", the code name for a villainous politician, Lord Moran, who is acting as a mole for North Korea and plans to detonate a bomb at an abandoned London Underground station called Sumatra Road.

Other references

 The giant Sumatran rat is mentioned in the 1972 novel Watership Down in one of the rabbits' allegorical tales.
 In "A Father's Tale", a 1974 novelet by Sterling E. Lanier, the narrator, Brigadier Ffellowes, recounts his father's story of an encounter in the East Indies with a mysterious man calling himself "Verner", and a race of large, intelligent rats.
 The entry for giant rats in the original Advanced Dungeons & Dragons Monster Manual had the header of "Rat, giant (Sumatran)". 
 Braindead, a 1992 film by Peter Jackson, features a Sumatran Rat-monkey, a hybrid that "according to legend" resulted from the rape of tree monkeys by plague rats on Skull Island.
 The Giant Rat of Sumatra: or Pirates Galore is a 2005 children's novel by Sid Fleischman. It is not a Sherlock Holmes story; the Giant Rat of the title is a pirate ship anchored off the coast of California in 1846.
 In his 2011 bestseller, The Psychopath Test, Jon Ronson tells the story of a book project where prominent academics across the globe are being sent a mysterious self-referential book, Being or Nothingness, commonly referred to as "The Giant Rat of Sumatra".
 The final issue of the Marvel Comic Before The Fantastic Four: Reed Richards features the title character promising to tell his son Franklin about how he met "The Giant Rat of Sumatra".
 In The Adventures of Tintin movie, when Captain Haddock first gets woken up by Tintin and Snowy, he yells, “A giant rat of Sumatra!”

References

Fictional mice and rats
Mythological rodents
Sherlock Holmes